The 1986 USFL Draft was the fourth and last Collegiate Draft of the United States Football League (USFL). It took place on May 6, 1986, at the Grand Hyatt Hotel in New York.

Player selections

References

External links
 1986 USFL Draft Pick Transactions
 USFL DraftRound by Round

United States Football League drafts
USFL Draft
USFL Draft
1980s in Manhattan
American football in New York City
Sports in Manhattan
Sporting events in New York City
USFL Draft